The Battle of Charasiab was fought on 6 October 1879 during the Second Anglo-Afghan War between British and Indian troops against Afghan regular forces and tribesmen.

The battle
The first phase of the Afghan War ended in May 1879 with the Treaty of Gandamak. However, when in September 1879 the British envoy in Kabul was murdered, the war recommenced. A Kabul Field Force was created, commanded by Major-General Sir Frederick Roberts, which advanced on Kabul. The next morning, 6 October, saw a large force of regular Afghan soldiers, equipped with artillery and reinforced by local tribesmen, on the ridge of the hills ahead. It was led by Nek Mohammed Khan, Governor of Kabul and uncle of former Amir Yakub Khan, who intended to attack the British.

Attacking first, Roberts' force feinted to the left of the Afghan line, before launching his main attack to the right. The fighting lasted several hours, but eventually the Afghan army was pushed back, and by 3:45 pm the British-led force had opened the route to Kabul. After this, Roberts resumed his advance and occupied Kabul on 13 October.

British casualties amounted to 18 killed and 70 wounded, while Afghans deaths exceeded 300. Twenty Afghan field guns were captured, including an eight-inch brass howitzer previously presented to the Afghan government by the British; as was a large proportion of the small arms and ammunition used during the battle.

The British force was equipped with two Gatling guns, with Charasiab the first time these rapid fire guns were used in action.

The spelling of the battle varied. The formal dispatch published in the London Gazette stated 'Charasiab', the regiments present received the battle honour 'Charasiah', while General Roberts' memoirs and the clasp authorised for the Afghanistan Medal referred to 'Charasia'.

Order of battle
The following regiments participated in the battle:

British Army
 9th Lancers (1 squadron)
 Royal Horse Artillery (F/A Brigade)
 Royal Artillery (G/3 Battery)
 67th Foot
 72nd Highlanders
 92nd Highlanders

Indian Army
 5th Cavalry, Punjab Frontier Force
 12th Bengal Cavalry
 14th Bengal Lancers
 2nd Derajat Mountain Battery
 Bengal Sappers and Miners
 23rd Bengal Native Infantry (Pioneers)
 3rd Sikh Infantry
 5th Punjabis (Vaughan’s Rifles)
 28th Bengal Native Infantry (Punjabis)
 5th Gurkha Rifles

References

External links
 General Robert's dispatch for the Battle of Charasiab 
 The Battle of Charasiab, (britishbattles.com)

Conflicts in 1879
1879 in Afghanistan
Battles of the Second Anglo-Afghan War
Battles involving the United Kingdom
Battles involving Afghanistan
October 1879 events